is the 30th single by Japanese entertainer Akina Nakamori. Written by Gorō Matsui and Shūgō Kajiwara, the single was released on October 5, 1994, by MCA Victor.

Background 
"Gekka" was initially recorded by composer Kajiwara and released as a single on September 21, 1994, two weeks before Nakamori's version was released. Nakamori's version was used as an image song for Miki Corporation's "Boutique Joy" commercials.

Nakamori has re-recorded "Gekka" for the 1995 compilation True Album Akina 95 Best.

Chart performance 
"Gekka" peaked at No. 8 on Oricon's weekly singles chart and sold over 137,400 copies. It was also certified Gold by the RIAJ.

Track listing

Charts

Certification

References

External links 
 
 

1994 singles
1994 songs
Akina Nakamori songs
Japanese-language songs
Songs with lyrics by Gorō Matsui
Universal Music Japan singles
MCA Records singles